Craig Gerber is an American executive producer and creator of children's television programming, best known for Disney Junior's Sofia the First, which ran from 2012 to 2018 and Elena of Avalor, which ran from 2016 to 2020 and Firebuds which began airing on September 21st 2022. Gerber is often credited and praised for creating shows that deal with blended families, breaking gender stereotypes, difficulty fitting into society and representation of Latin culture.

Early life 
Gerber was raised in outer suburban New York. His mother and father divorced when he was eight years old. His father remarried and had another son, while his mother had a boyfriend who had a daughter of his own. Having a family that was not “together” made Gerber feel uneasy, but after he discovered that these kinds of families were more common than he thought, he was inspired to create Sofia the First. Gerber is of Jewish background.

Education and early career 
Gerber graduated from University of Southern California School of Cinematic Arts.  His career skyrocketed after he entered a screenwriting showcase at his school, which led to a major Hollywood studio displaying his first screenplay. Gerber has also won awards for directing his comedic short “Hang Time” and won Best Narrative Short at the Sonoma Valley Film Festival and Best Digital Short at the Sedona Film Festival in 2003.  Before branching off into children's television, Craig Gerber previously worked at Pixie Hollow Games and wrote screenplays for Rogue Pictures, Radar Pictures, and Intrepid Films.

Filmmaking credits
 Sofia the First - 2012-2018 - creator, writer, lyricist, composer: main title theme, executive producer, and voice actor
 The Pirate Fairy - 2014 - story
 Elena of Avalor - 2016-2020 - creator, director, writer, lyricist, and executive producer
 Firebuds - 2022-present - creator, writer, lyricist, and executive producer

Creation of Sofia the First 
Gerber was approached by Nancy Kanter, a writer at Disney Junior who asked him for an idea for a children's show revolving around a princess during her childhood.  He was determined to give a modern spin of the classic “fairy tale” element of the pitch. Thus, in November 2012, Sofia the First was created.
When Gerber was stuck in traffic while driving in Los Angeles, he immediately looked at his childhood and found inspiration with his own home life to create a show with a family that many children could identify with.   Growing up in a Stepfamily, he wanted to emulate how it is normal this type of situation is for people.  In the program, he provides the young princess with a stepsister, stepbrother, and stepdad; something that is a new territory for her. Gerber's then three-year-old son, Miles, was also an influence for him, constantly making believe, sometimes even as a princess, which led him to provide a character that he could relate to.

The character that Gerber created, Princess Sofia, was designed to be a role model for both boys and girls. Gerber stated in an article “In a world where many young girls want to dress up as princesses, Sofia could serve as a positive role model, displaying traits and learning lessons that young girls (or boys) will retain long after they trade in their gowns for other costumes.”
 
Kind, courageous, bold, and curious are just a few of the qualities Gerber wanted to give Princess Sofia in order to make a positive character.   He explains “To that end, Sofia is very adventurous, and bold, and courageous, and curious. She has a big heart, and she’s always ready to try new things, and she’s always ready to stand up for what she believes in or what she thinks is right. By the way, I think these are good qualities for both girls and boys to follow. And so there’s a feminist message. There’s also a message for both boys and girls, saying you can do anything you set your mind to if you keep trying and don’t give up – that life is an adventure.”  Another important element he wanted to provide her with was to make her flawed. Sometimes she could mess up dealing with issues of sibling rivalry, sharing, or trying a new thing. This was a very important message Gerber wanted to provide to his young viewers. Gerber describes Sofia's faults as “Sofia’s biggest flaw is that she is too trusting. It will take her a long time to learn this lesson.”

Along with creating the show, Gerber has also co-authored many of the program's storybooks. These books include Sofia the First: The Curse of Princess Ivy, Sofia the First: The Floating Palace, and Sofia the First: The Enchanted Feast. He has also co-authored a book based on his new program Elena of Avalor called Elena and the Secret of Avalor.

Creation of Elena of Avalor 
With a heavy focus on exploring Latin and Hispanic culture, magic, mythology, folklore, music, food, and customs, following his success with Sofia the First, Gerber went on to create Elena of Avalor in June 2016.  He was aware that there had been many Disney princesses of color, but not one of Hispanic roots. Gerber was careful not to state what country she is exactly from, but rather incorporate the “influence” of the location. He stated, “What Disney really does well is create fairytale kingdoms,” he explained. “It makes it very inclusive—you don’t have to pick just one nationality. No one really asked if Arendelle was Norway or Sweden, it’s just inspired by a Scandinavian country. The idea for us was that we wanted Avalor to be more broadly accessible.”

Creation of Firebuds 
Firebuds is the first series to debut under Gerber's development deal with Disney Branded Television, which premiered on September 21, 2022. Firebuds is set in a fantastical world where people and anthropomorphic vehicles live in parallel, centering around a boy and this firetruck that aspire to become full-fledged firefighters at one point. With an emphasis on the spirit of community service and mindfulness of others, the characters in Firebuds aspire to follow their parent's "tire treads" to help others within this community.

Critical reception 
Gerber has been noted for his representation of many different relatable situations children and individuals can go through. Marjorie Galas of Variety 411 praises his view on Princess Sofia's home life in Sofia the First, stating “A child of divorce himself, Gerber knew the blended family life and the adaptation to new surroundings and routines was relatable to a vast majority of the population, and the lessons that come from adaptation were bountiful.”

Personal life 
A native of Miami, Gerber currently resides in Los Angeles with his wife and three sons.

External links

References

Living people
Year of birth missing (living people)
American television writers
American television producers